Bülent Kaan Bilgen (born 5 April 1977) is an Austrian footballer of Turkish descent who plays for FC Union Innsbruck.

Honours 
 Kocaelispor
Turkish Cup (1): 2002

References

1977 births
Living people
Austrian people of Turkish descent
Turkish footballers
Austrian footballers
FC Wacker Innsbruck (2002) players
Kocaelispor footballers

Association football defenders
FC Tirol Innsbruck players